Tylopilus corneri is a bolete fungus in the family Boletaceae found in Costa Rica, where it grows under oak in montane forest. Described as new to science in 1991, it is named after English mycologist E.J.H. Corner.

References

External links

corneri
Fungi described in 1991
Fungi of Central America